Rain Taxi is a Minneapolis-based book review and literary organization.  In addition to publishing its quarterly print edition, Rain Taxi maintains an online edition with distinct content, sponsors the Twin Cities Book Festival, hosts readings, and publishes chapbooks through its Brainstorm Series. Rain Taxis mission is “to advance independent literary culture through publications and programs that foster awareness and appreciation of innovative writing.” , the magazine distributes 18,000 copies through 250 bookstores as well as to subscribers. The magazine is free on the newsstand. It is also available through paid subscription. Structurally, Rain Taxi is a 501(c)(3) non-profit. It sells advertising at below market rates, much of it to literary presses.

History 
The magazine was founded in 1996 by Carolyn Kuebler, Randall Heath, and David Caligiuri (who resigned with issue one). Current editor Eric Lorberer joined the staff after issue one. The magazine is art-directed and business-managed by Kelly Everding.

Rain Taxi has been relatively free of controversy and widely lauded for its role in bringing to light books which might not otherwise be reviewed.  It has been awarded the 2000 Utne Reader Alternative Press Award for Best Arts and Literature Coverage and Best Literary Journal in City Pages (Minneapolis).  Editor Eric Lorberer was named to the Publishers Weekly “The Twin Cities Top 10.” 

An exception to the lack of controversy was David Foster Wallace’s Summer 2001 review of The Best of the Prose Poem: An International Journal (White Pine Press). The review, which took the form of a bullet-pointed index that “broke down the anthology into numerical components,” inflamed many of the book’s contributors. See responses in Fall 2001 print edition of the magazine.

The magazine publishes relatively few dismissive reviews.  Lorberer explained that “the reason the majority of the reviews are positive is that the process of selection itself is an aspect of reviewing–we’re trying to select the best of the best.” And former Board Member and Twin Cities journalist Josie Rawson notes, “There are so few avenues in the reviewing press for praise for books from small presses, independent presses, it’s hardly worth wasting space on books nobody should be reading anyway.”

Rain Taxi Review of Books (Print) 
Rain Taxi focuses on literary fiction, poetry, and non-fiction with an emphasis on small press and offbeat books. The review features interviews with prominent writers such as Lydia Davis and Tao Lin; reviewers include Sharon Mesmer, Jacob Appel, Spencer Dew, Noah Eli Gordon and Mark Terrill.

Raintaxi.com 
The site includes distinct content not found in the print edition, as well as information about events publications.  , it receives approximately 15,000 hits a day.

Brainstorm Series Chapbooks 
Rain Taxi publishes limited edition chapbooks, each limited to 300 copies or less. Authors have included Kees ’t Hart, Alice Notley, Donald Revell, Dara Wier, Nathaniel Tarn, Paul Auster, Russell Edson, Anne Waldman and Rikki Ducornet (collaboration), Kai Nieminen, James Tate, Stephen Dixon, Paul Metcalf, and Clayton Eshleman.

Twin Cities Book Festival 
Rain Taxi launched the Twin Cities Book Festival in 2001. The festival includes readings, talks, book signings, panel discussions, children’s activities, book arts demonstrations, a used book sale, and a Literary Magazine Fair.

Rain Taxi Readings 
The Rain Taxi Reading Series began in 1998 and has hosted more than 200 writers.

References

External links
 Official website

Book review magazines
Rain Taxi
Magazines established in 1996
Magazines published in Minnesota
Quarterly magazines published in the United States
Mass media in Minneapolis–Saint Paul